Dwight Mais (born 27 October 1977) is a Jamaican cricketer. He played in fourteen first-class and three List A matches for the Jamaican cricket team from 1998 to 2004.

See also
 List of Jamaican representative cricketers

References

External links
 

1977 births
Living people
Jamaican cricketers
Jamaica cricketers
People from Saint Catherine Parish